Frog on a Stick is the debut extended play (EP) by British indie rock band The Crocketts, under the name The Crocketts 20th Century Vikings. Recorded at Al's Recording Studio in Lampeter, Ceredigion, the EP features seven tracks and was released in 1996 by Oozy Bozone Records. "Stunner" was later featured on the band's first EP with Blue Dog Records and V2 Records, Hello & Good Morning, released in 1997. Frog on a Stick was the only release by the band to feature original members Hannah Fowler and Graham Salisbury, and the only not to feature Salisbury's replacement, Owen Hopkin.

Track listing
All songs credited to The Crocketts.

Personnel
Davey MacManus – vocals, accordion
Dan Harris – guitar, backing vocals
Hannah Fowler – acoustic guitar, backing vocals
Richard Carter – bass
Graham Salisbury – drums, backing vocals

References

1996 debut EPs
The Crocketts albums